Lomamyia is a genus of beaded lacewings in the family Berothidae. There are about 11 described species in Lomamyia.

Biology
Larvae of Lomamyia are predatory upon termites, and they have been shown to incapacitate their prey using a chemical sprayed from their anus.

Species
These 11 species belong to the genus Lomamyia:
 Lomamyia banksi Carpenter, 1940
 Lomamyia flavicornis (Walker, 1853)
 Lomamyia fulva Carpenter, 1940
 Lomamyia hamata (Walker, 1853)
 Lomamyia latipennis Carpenter, 1940
 Lomamyia longicollis (Walker, 1853)
 Lomamyia occidentalis (Banks in Baker, 1905)
 Lomamyia squamosa Carpenter, 1940
 Lomamyia tenuis Carpenter, 1940
 Lomamyia texana (Banks, 1897)
 Lomamyia trombetensis Penny, 1985

References

Further reading

 
 
 
 

Hemerobiiformia
Neuroptera genera